Scaptesyle middletoni is a moth in the subfamily Arctiinae. It was described by Turner in 1941. It is found in Australia.

References

Moths described in 1941
Lithosiini